Cynthia Dianne Steel is a retired family judge who served the eight district of Nevada from 1997 until her retirement on January 8, 2019. She was the most senior judge in the district court at the time of her retirement. She helped establish One Family, One Judge.

See also 

 List of female state supreme court justices
 List of first women lawyers and judges in Nevada

References

External links 
 Judge Cynthia Dianne Steel - Clark Country biography

American judges
Candidates in the 2022 United States House of Representatives elections
Living people
Year of birth missing (living people)